Frost Like Ashes is a Christian black metal band that formed in Kansas City, Missouri in 2001. The band has released two EPs - Born to Pieces and Pure as the Blood Covered Snow - and a full-length album, Tophet, and their songs have appeared on three compilation albums. Previously signed to Psycho Acoustix Records and currently to Sullen Records, an imprint of Open Grave Records, their music combines elements of black metal, death metal and thrash metal with keyboards and virtuosic vocals notable for "switching between about 10 different extreme styles within a given song." Their lyrics have achieved attention for their harsh output, providing a Biblical point of view for the regular, cruel themes of black metal music. The band is also controversial for using the typical corpse paint style often associated with the black metal visuals.

Their live act incorporates a reversal of stereotypical black-metal images—for example, spitting in and tearing up a Satanic Bible and smashing a goat-skull adorned pentagram with a sword.

History 

Two of the band members, vocalist Azahel and drummer Adonijah, were former members of a controversial death metal and thrash metal band, Possession that was active from 1992 to 1998. Frost Like Ashes was formed on the vision of guitarist, Sebat (formerly of World Funeral and Coven), who would recruit Azahel (vocals) and Syntyche (bass) in 2001 and begin what has become a hybrid of black metal and death metal.

Adonijah (drums), completed the group and they were a part of a sampler for Tarantula Promotions, titled Arachnid Terror Sampler, which featured bands such as Soul Embraced, Tortured Conscience, Frosthardr, and Kekal in 2002, and released their first EP on SoTD Records in 2003. In January 2003, Qoheleth joined the band as their first full-time dedicated keyboardist. Up to this point Adonijah would compose and record the keyboard parts. In 2004, The band parted ways with Syntyche and acquired the skills of new bassist, Ruach.

In 2005, after some delays, Frost Like Ashes' first full-length album, Tophet, was finally released.

On March 13, 2008, Blabbermouth.net reported that the band signed a record deal with Sullen records, an imprint of Open Grave Records, for the release of the band's EP, titled Born to Pieces. The EP sold out shortly after its release, and a limited edition 7-inch vinyl was printed of Born to Pieces later. Fire, of the Polish black metal band Elgibbor, played bass for Frost Like Ashes at their Cornerstone Festival concert on July 3, 2008 to mark his full-time permanent membership in the band.

They were working on a concept album based on a book vocalist Azahel. The album, tentatively titled Gods of the Great Whore, was put on-hold on January 2, 2009 until the book was written. They have written new material for another album, tentatively entitled Who Walks in the Darkness, and is to be based on a R. A. Salvatore novel, Homeland.

In 2010, the band announced that they were going on hiatus. They have said they will make new music, but they don't see it happening right now.

In 2017, Sebat formed a label, Nosral Recordings, and signed several bands. The label is re-releasing all of Frost Like Ashes' music and re-released Live in Omaha DVD. On February 24, 2019, it was announced the project would return to record a new album, with the lineup of Sebat on Guitars, Azahel on Vocals, Fire on Bass, Qoheleth on Keyboards, and new Drummer Grond, replacing the longtime member Adonijah. The band is currently signed with Rottweiler Records. On May 29, 2020, it was announced that Grond would no longer be continuing with the project and he would be replaced by the "Blastronaut". On March 26, 2021, the band released their debut single "The Weight of Ice and Fog", from their upcoming release, Fellowship of Suffering.

Names
The band members use aliases in their albums and press to keep their identities secret, much like normal black metal, but the band's aliases have  meanings behind them. Azahel is an alternative spelling of Asahel, a figure in the Bible, Fire is the translation of Bassist Jarek Pozarycki's name, Qoheleth means teacher or preacher, Adonijah was the name of one of David's sons, and Sebat is Guitarist Michael Larson's "name". Though the band uses aliases, many of their names have become public knowledge.

Members
Current members
Nyk "Azahel" Edinger – vocals (2001–present)
Michael John "Sebat" Larson – guitar (2001–present)
Jarek "Fire" Pozarycki – bass guitar (2008–present)
Gabriel "Qoheleth" Howarth – keyboard (2004–present)
"The Blastronaut" – drums (2020–present)

Former members
Eric – drums (2001–2002)
Shayne Scholl – guitar (2001)
Syntyche – bass (2001–2004)
Ruach – bass (2004–2008)
Shane "Adonijah" Goade – drums (2002–2010)
Kaleb “Grond” Luebchow – drums (2019–2020), (died in 2022)

Timeline

Discography 
Full-length albums
Tophet (Psycho Acoustix Records) – 2005

EPs
Pure as the Blood Covered Snow (SOTD Records) – 2003
Born to Pieces (Sullen Records) – 2008
Fellowship or Suffering (Rottweiler Records) – 2021

Singles
 "Born to Pieces" (2008)
 "The Weight of Ice and Fog" (2021)

Compilation appearances
A Brutal Christmas (SOTD Records) – 2002
A Treasury of Sorrows (Lifeless Records) – 2004
Back in the Day: An Old School Album (The Bearded Dragon Productions) – 2018

References

External links 
 
 Article in HM Magazine
 Interview at Wisemenpromotions
 Interview at Rock-impressions

Musical groups established in 2001
Heavy metal musical groups from Missouri
American black metal musical groups
Unblack metal musical groups
American Christian rock groups
Christian extreme metal groups
Musical quintets
Musical groups from Kansas City, Missouri